John of Orléans, Count of Angoulême and of Périgord (26 June 1399 – 30 April 1467), was a younger son of Louis I, Duke of Orléans, and Valentina Visconti, and a grandson of Charles V of France. He was the younger brother of the noted poet, Charles, Duke of Orléans, and grandfather of Francis I of France.

John was handed over to the English in 1412, according to the terms of the Treaty of Buzançais, and not released until 1444. In 1415 he was joined by his older brother Charles, with whom he shared an interest in literature. He had to sell part of his estates to pay for his ransom, but still collected many books. After that, he fought under the orders of his illegitimate half-brother, Jean de Dunois, driving the English out of Guyenne in 1451.

On 31 August 1449, he married Marguerite de Rohan, daughter of Alain IX of Rohan and Margaret of Brittany. They had:
 Louis (1455–1458)
 Charles (1459–1496). Father of Francis I, King of France
 Joan (1462–1520), who married Charles François de Coetivy, count de Taillebourg
He also had an illegitimate son, Jean de Valois, bastard of Angoulême, who was legitimised in 1458.

"Good Count John" died in 1467. He is buried in the Cathedral of Angoulême.

References

Sources

1399 births
1467 deaths
15th-century peers of France
Counts of Angoulême
House of Valois-Angoulême
French book and manuscript collectors
French prisoners of war in the Hundred Years' War
Prisoners and detainees of England and Wales